The southeastern crown snake (Tantilla coronata) is a common species of small colubrid snake endemic to the southeastern United States.

Description
T. coronata is a small, slender snake, greyish-brown or solid light brown in color. It has a black, pointed head with a yellowish or cream band between the head and the neck. This is followed by a black collar 3 to 5 scales wide. The remainder of the back  is reddish brown.  The belly is light pink or solid white.  It has smooth dorsal scales in 15 rows and a divided anal plate. Adults average 20–25 cm (8-10 inches) in total length.

Natural habitat
The snake is found in Alabama, northwestern Florida, Georgia, extreme southern Indiana, western Kentucky, eastern Louisiana, Mississippi, North Carolina, South Carolina, Tennessee, and south-central Virginia. The largest populations of the species is found in areas with sandy or loose soils and plentiful organic litter. The southeastern crown snake is commonly found in both damp and dry woodland habitats.

Behavior and diet
The snake is active during the day during the warmer months of the year, and can be found underneath rocks, logs and organic litter. It hibernates during the coldest months of winter, but is active beneath organic litter on warm winter days. The snake travels overland at night, generally during the hours of early evening. It is considered a skilled burrower in sandy soil, and appears to "swim" in the sand when attempting to escape capture.

The snake feeds on several kinds of small prey, including termites, worms, centipedes, earth-dwelling insect larvae. and spiders In the back of the snake's jaw are small, chiseled fangs that are used to inject venom into their prey. All crowned snakes are assumed to be non-venomous to humans.

Reproduction
Mating occurs in the months from spring through fall. Females that mate in the fall store sperm until the following spring. Females lay their eggs typically in June and July. The eggs hatch in the fall.

Predators and defense
Southeastern crown snakes are preyed upon by many carnivorous vertebrates that live in forested habitats. Their most common predator is the kingsnake and coral snake. The snake will attempt to burrow in the sand when threatened, or by crawling beneath organic litter and other debris. The snake does not bite when captured, but releases a foul-smelling musk from their scent glands.

Conservation status
In most areas of its range, the southeastern crown snake is not considered to be a conservation risk. In Indiana, the  snake is listed as an endangered species. Damage or destruction to their forested habitats will have an adverse effect on the future population of the species.

References

Further reading
Baird, S.F., and C.F. Girard. 1853. Catalogue of the North American Reptiles in the Museum of the Smithsonian Institution. Part I.—Serpents. Smithsonian Institution. Washington, District of Columbia. xvi + 172 pp. (Tantilla coronata, p. 131.)
Conant, R., and W. Bridges. 1939. What Snake Is That? A Field Guide to the Snakes of the United States East of the Rocky Mountains. D. Appleton-Century. New York and London. Frontispiece map + viii + 163 pp. + Plates A-C, 1-32. (Tantilla coronata, pp. 129–130 + Plate C, Figure 13 + Plate 25, Figure 75.)
Smith, H.M., and E.D. Brodie, Jr. 1982. Reptiles of North America: A Guide to Field Identification. Golden Press. New York.  (paperback). (Tantilla coronata, pp. 170–171.)
Wright, A.H., and A.A. Wright. 1957. Handbook of Snakes of the United States and Canada. Comstock. Ithaca and London. 1,105 pp. (in 2 volumes) (Tantilla coronata, pp. 728–737, Figures 213. & 214., Map 56.)

Colubrids
Reptiles described in 1853
Endemic fauna of the United States
Fauna of the Southeastern United States
Reptiles of the United States
Snakes of North America